WEC 36: Faber vs. Brown was a mixed martial arts event held by World Extreme Cagefighting that took place on November 5, 2008 at the Seminole Hard Rock Hotel and Casino in Hollywood, Florida. The event aired live on the Versus Network.

Background
WEC Middleweight Champion Paulo Filho fought Chael Sonnen in the co-main event of the evening in a rematch of their WEC 31 title fight, where Filho won via a controversial submission. The rematch was also supposed to be a title bout, but became a non-title fight after Filho failed to make weight. After losing the fight (but not the title) to Sonnen, Filho pledged to mail the belt to Sonnen, but the division was absorbed into the UFC on December 3, before future plans for the title could be determined, making this the last middleweight fight in WEC history.

Danillo Villefort was supposed to make his WEC debut against Jake Rosholt at this event, but was pulled from the bout after his visa expired. He was replaced by fellow WEC newcomer Nissen Osterneck.

This event was originally scheduled for September 10, 2008 but was postponed due to the threat of Hurricane Ike. 

The event drew an estimated 497,000 viewers on Versus.

Results

Bonus awards
Fighters were awarded $7,500 bonuses.

Fight of the Night:  Donald Cerrone vs.  Rob McCullough
Knockout of the Night:  Mike Brown and  Leonard Garcia
Submission of the Night:  Rani Yahya

Reported payouts
The following is the reported payout to the fighters as reported to the Florida State Athletic Commission. It does not include sponsor money or "locker room" bonuses often given by the WEC.

Mike Brown: $18,000 (includes $9,000 win bonus) def. Urijah Faber: $24,000
Chael Sonnen: $48,250 ($19,000 win bonus) def. Paulo Filho: $30,750 ^
Leonard Garcia: $20,000 ($10,000 win bonus) def. Jens Pulver: $33,000
Jake Rosholt: $22,000 ($11,000 win bonus) def. Nissen Osterneck: $4,000
Donald Cerrone: $14,000 ($7,000 win bonus) def. Rob McCullough: $18,000
Aaron Simpson: $10,000 ($5,000 win bonus) def. David Avellan: $3,000
José Aldo: $8,000 ($4,000 win bonus) def. Jonathan Brookins: $3,000
Carmelo Marrero: $8,000 ($4,000 win bonus) def. Steve Steinbeiss: $6,000
Danny Castillo: $6,000 ($3,000 win bonus) def. Rafael Dias: $3,000
Rani Yayha: $12,000 ($6,000 win bonus) def. Yoshiro Maeda: $6,000

^ Filho was forced to surrender 25 percent of his base pay to Sonnen after failing to make weight for the fight.

See also 
 World Extreme Cagefighting
 List of World Extreme Cagefighting champions
 List of WEC events
 2008 in WEC

External links
Official WEC website

References

World Extreme Cagefighting events
2008 in mixed martial arts
Mixed martial arts in Florida
Sports in Hollywood, Florida
2008 in sports in Florida
Events in Hollywood, Florida